The Trans-Amazonian Railway is a proposed transcontinental railroad megaproject that will link the Atlantic and Pacific Oceans via the Amazon Forest. It is estimated to cost $10 billion.

As of 2022, construction has not started yet.

See also
 Rail transport in Brazil
 Rail transport in Peru
 Transport in Brazil
 Transport in Peru
 Central Bi-Oceanic railway 
 Transcontinental railway Brasil-Peru
 Madeira-Mamoré Railroad

References

External links
 EF-354 - TRANSCONTINENTAL RAILROAD
 The Transcontinental Railroad: an interactive map

Railway lines in Brazil
Proposed railway lines in South America
Proposed railway lines in Brazil